John Simmons may refer to:

Sports
John Simmons (American football) (born 1958), American football defensive back
John Simmons (baseball) (1920–2008), American baseball and basketball player
John Simmons (canoeist) (1912–2005), British canoeist in the 1940s
Jonathon Simmons (born 1989), American basketball player

Music
John Simmons (musician) (1918–1979), American musician
John Simmons (conductor) (1943–1988), American conductor, musical arranger, soul singer and keyboardist

Acting
John Simmons (actor) (born 1955), founder, Gross National Product Comedy Group
Johnny Simmons (born 1986), actor

Others
John Simmons (clothing manufacturer) (1796–1870), Massachusetts clothing manufacturer and founder of Simmons College
John Simmons (horticulturist) (born 1937), British horticulturist, former curator of the Royal Botanic Gardens, Kew
John Simon Gabriel Simmons (1915–2005), British scholar
John Simmons (painter) (1823–1876), British painter
John F. Simmons (1892–1968), United States Chief of Protocol
A. John Simmons (born 1950), American political philosopher

See also 
Jack Simmons (disambiguation)
John Simmonds (disambiguation)
John Symonds (disambiguation)
Jonathan Simons (born 1958), doctor